ICSA Labs (International Computer Security Association) began as NCSA (National Computer Security Association).  Its mission was to increase awareness of the need for computer security and to provide education about various security products and technologies.

In its early days, NCSA focused almost solely on the certification of anti-virus software.  Using the Consortia model, NCSA worked together with anti-virus software vendors to develop one of the first anti-virus software certification schemes.  Over the past decade, the organization added certification programs for other security-related products, and changed its name to ICSA Labs.

Operating as an independent division of Verizon, ICSA Labs provides resources for research, intelligence, certification and testing of products, including anti-virus, firewall, IPsec VPN, cryptography, SSL VPN, network IPS, anti-spyware and PC firewall products.

External links

Computer security organizations
Verizon Communications

 Advanced Threat Defense Certification Testing Report. Executed by: Kaspersky